Kevin Guskiewicz (born April 8, 1966) is an American academic administrator who is the 12th chancellor and 30th chief executive of the University of North Carolina at Chapel Hill. He gained prominence as a neuroscientist, sports medicine researcher, and Kenan Distinguished Professor at UNC-Chapel Hill. He is one of the Principal Investigators of the Injury Prevention Research Center, and directs the Matthew Gfeller Sport-Related Traumatic Brain Injury Research Center.
He is a 2011 MacArthur Fellow. On January 1, 2016, he became Dean of the College of Arts and Sciences at UNC-Chapel Hill. On February 6, 2019, he was announced as interim chancellor, and on December 13, 2019, he was named chancellor by the UNC Board of Governors.

Education and career
A Greater Latrobe High School athlete who participated in football and tennis, Guskiewicz graduated from West Chester University with a bachelor's in athletic training in 1989, from University of Pittsburgh with a master's degree, where he worked for the Pittsburgh Steelers, and from University of Virginia with a Ph.D. in 1995.
He was a member of the National Football League’s head, neck and spine committee, and partnered with the NCAA.

Personal life 
Guskiewicz was born in Latrobe, Pennsylvania. He resides in Chapel Hill, North Carolina with his wife and four children.

References

External links
Epidemiology of Concussion in Collegiate and High School Football Players
Prof Kevin Guskiewicz Wins "Genius Grant"

1966 births
American medical researchers
University of North Carolina at Chapel Hill faculty
West Chester University alumni
University of Pittsburgh alumni
University of Virginia School of Medicine alumni
MacArthur Fellows
Living people
People from Latrobe, Pennsylvania